Jacox is an unincorporated community in Pocahontas County, West Virginia, United States.

The community was named the local Jacox family of pioneer settlers.

References

Unincorporated communities in Pocahontas County, West Virginia
Unincorporated communities in West Virginia